Charles Casey Finnegan (March 28, 1890 – December 28, 1958) was an American football coach. He served as the head football coach at North Dakota Agricultural College—now known as North Dakota State University—from 1928 to 1940, compiling a career college football record of 57–48–11. In 1928, Finnegan co-coached with Stanley Borleske, who had previously coached at North Dakota Agricultural from 1919 to 1921 and again from 1923 to 1924.

Finnegan graduated from Ripon College in Ripon, Wisconsin in 1913 and attended the University of Wisconsin for graduate study in 1924.  He died on December 28, 1958, in  Grafton, North Dakota.

Head coaching record

References

External links
 

1890 births
1958 deaths
North Dakota State Bison athletic directors
North Dakota State Bison football coaches
Ripon College (Wisconsin) alumni
University of Wisconsin–Madison alumni
People from New Richmond, Wisconsin